HMS Norfolk was a  heavy cruiser of the Royal Navy; along with her sister ship  she was part of a planned four-ship subclass.

Construction
She was laid down in July 1927 at Govan by Fairfield Shipbuilding & Engineering Co. Ltd and launched on 12 December 1928. She was commissioned on 30 April 1930.

Service history

Inter-war period
In September 1931, the crew of the Norfolk were part of a mutiny that later became known as the  Invergordon Mutiny. The ship later served with the Home Fleet until 1932 and then went to the America and West Indies Station based at the Royal Naval Dockyard on Ireland Island in the Imperial fortress colony of Bermuda, between 1932 and 1934. Ships based at Bermuda spent much of the year cruising around the Americas individually or in small groups, while being available to respond to states of emergencies (including hurricane relief and protecting British interests during civil wars such as the Cristero War in Mexico) anywhere in the region. The entire squadron would exercise at Bermuda. From 1935 to 1939, she served with the Commander-in-Chief, East Indies, before coming home to refit in 1939, being still in dockyard hands when war was declared.

Second World War
She was soon receiving numerous repairs for damage that she had received, not to mention vital modifications to the ship.

Shortly afterward, bomb damage that she had received from a heavy air raid by Kampfgeschwader 26 at Scapa Flow on 16 March 1940 forced her into yet another repair, this time on the Clyde. After these repairs had been completed Norfolk proceeded to a shipyard on the River Tyne for a new addition to her equipment – a radar set.

In December 1940, Norfolk was ordered to the South Atlantic on trade protection duties. Operating out of Freetown as part of Force K she participated in the hunt for Admiral Scheer. In January 1941 Norfolk, under the command of Capt. Phillips, joined in a search for the German auxiliary cruiser  in the South Atlantic. In February, she escorted Atlantic troop convoys, but by May she had returned to Icelandic waters. Norfolk was the second ship to sight the German battleship , after  another County-class cruiser she was patrolling with. Norfolk and Suffolk  continued to trail the German battleship before and after the Battle of the Denmark Strait; Suffolk had to break off as it was low on oil.

From September onward, she was employed as an escort for the arduous Arctic Convoys. During this period, Dorsetshire had been bombed and sunk by Japanese torpedo and dive bombers in the Pacific Theatre as part of the Eastern Fleet's attempts to dodge Japanese advances on Ceylon. Norfolk was part of the cruiser covering force of Convoy JW 55B when it engaged Scharnhorst, on 26 December 1943. She scored three hits on the German ship, and received several 11-in shell hits (all passing through the thin-skinned ship without exploding) in return, before she withdrew; Scharnhorst was later caught and sunk by the battleship  and her escorting cruisers and destroyers.

She sustained damage (especially to X-turret and barbette) in that confrontation, and she was subsequently repaired/refitted (losing X-turret in favour of additional AA guns) on the Tyne, which prevented her from being involved in the historic D-day landings. When the war came to a close, Norfolk left Plymouth for a much needed refit at Malta, after transporting the Norwegian Royal family back to Oslo after their five-year exile in London. This was followed by service in the East Indies as the flagship of the Commander-in-Chief, East Indies.

Post-war
In 1949, Norfolk returned to Britain and was placed in Reserve. She was sold to BISCO for scrapping on 3 January 1950. On 14 February 1950, she proceeded to Newport, arriving on 19 February, to be broken up after 22 years of service, in which she gained the Norfolk lineage the majority of her battle honours, including her last.

Battle honours
Atlantic 1941
 1941
Arctic 1941–1943
North Africa 1942
North Cape 1943
Norway 1945

Notes

Footnotes

References

External links

 HMS Norfolk at U-boat.net
 Cruisers of World War II listing for HMS Norfolk

 

County-class cruisers of the Royal Navy
Ships built in Govan
1928 ships
World War II cruisers of the United Kingdom